Michael Bavaro is a filmmaker and creative strategist based in Boston.  He grew up in Milford, Massachusetts and graduated from Fitchburg State College in Fitchburg, Massachusetts with a B.S. degree in communications and received the "Communications Student of the Year Award" for film and television.  In 1980 while at Fitchburg he produced a 16mm documentary film about his hometown of Milford.  The film was part of the bicentennial celebration and featured WBZ radio personality, Larry Glick as the narrator.

Working the entertainment industry as an art director of broadcast promotion, Bavaro won several awards for his work for the Walt Disney Company and the NBC network.

In 1993 he established Digital Freeway, a new media company to design and create digital entertainment content.  Bavaro was one of the charter members of the fledgling telco joint venture of TELE-TV formed by Bell Atlantic, NYNEX and Pacific Telesis.  He was innovative in creating several concepts that would become part of the lexicon of digital media.

He recently produced a one-hour documentary about his childhood hero, Rex Trailer.  The film titled, "Rex Trailer's Boomtown" was broadcast on WBZ-TV in Boston and was nominated for a New England Emmy award for best historical documentary.  The broadcast master and archives are now part of the permanent collection at the Museum of Television & Radio in New York City.

Bavaro has recently finished a one-hour documentary film about the original Filene's Basement in Boston titled, "Voices from the Basement."  It premiered on May 10, 2010 in the rooftop ballroom of the Omni Parker House in Boston.  In attendance was former Massachusetts governor Michael Dukakis, Academy Award-winning actress Estelle Parsons, and many of the people who worked and shopped in The Basement over the past 100 years.  Also in attendance was the great-grandson of A. Lincoln Filene, David Robertson.

Review
Filmmaker Michael Bavaro was one of those kids who watched Rex Trailer on TV, thought it was real and never forgot the memory of its magic. "I grew up in Milford, Massachusetts and Boomtown was one of my first memories," he recalls. "I really believed it was the Wild West." He credits the show with sparking his interest in film and television.

References

External links
 "Boston Globe", "Interview with Michael Bavaro"
 "Happy Trails to Boomtown", New England Film
"Michael Bavaro", New England Film
"Film review of Michael Bavaro's Filene's Basement film"

People from Milford, Massachusetts
1959 births
Living people
Fitchburg State University alumni
Film directors from Massachusetts